Clemens Prüfer (born 13 August 1997) is a German athlete specialising in the discus throw. He represented Germany at the 2020 Summer Olympics in Tokyo 2021, where he finished 11th with a distance of 61.75 meters.

References

External links
 
 
 
 

1997 births
Living people
German male discus throwers
Olympic athletes of Germany
Athletes (track and field) at the 2014 Summer Youth Olympics
Athletes (track and field) at the 2020 Summer Olympics
Sportspeople from Potsdam